Anna Nikolayevna Levanova (born 19 December 1988) is a Russian television and film actress, known for  McMafia and Two Women. In 2014, she won the Yul Brynner Award of the Pacific Meridian International Film Festival of Asia Pacific Countries for her role in Two Women.

Biography
Anna Levanova (née Bulatova) was born in Moscow, Russian SFSR, Soviet Union (now Russia). There were no professional actors or musicians in her family, yet home concerts and performances have always been a family tradition. According to Anna, she made her debut on the stage in a kindergarten - in the role of a fox in a matinee performance.
From an early age she participated in school "skits" and went to the Children's Variety Theater.
Her parents were supportive of her decision to become an actress.

But right after school she did not pass the competition for the theater high school. She submitted documents to the State Musical and Pedagogical Institute named after M. Ippolitov-Ivanov and successfully graduated from the class of folk vocals in 2010.

In the fourth year she made the fourth attempt to enter the theater, and got into the Mikhail Shchepkin Higher Theatre School in the studio of Vasily Bochkarev. She graduated from one institution and simultaneously studied in the first year of the other.
She graduated from the Mikhail Shchepkin Higher Theatre School in 2013, workshop of V. Bochkarev.

In 2013-2016 she joined the troupe of the Moscow Theater "Sovremennik". Performed the role of Cinderella in the play "Cinderella" after the play by Evgeniy Schwartz, the daughter of the doctor in the "Decameron" Giovanni Boccaccio. In 2013, played in the Center V. Vysotsky, the role of Lizanka in the play "Zoyka apartment" by Mikhail Bulgakov.

Career
Anna Levanova starred in the series Farewell of Slavianka (2011), Secrets of the Institute of Noble Maidens (2013), My long distance car (2013), Lermontov (2014) and others.
She performed the main roles in the film-performance "Cinderella" in 2016, melodramas Wicked destiny (2016), For a better life (2016), Loneliness (2016), Choice (2017).

Personal life
Levanova was married once.

Filmography

Film

Television

References

External links
 

1988 births
Living people
Russian television actresses
Russian film actresses
Russian stage actresses
Actresses from Moscow
21st-century Russian actresses